The Wiyabal (also Widjabal, possibly from confusion of the letter  in the older spelling Wijabal) are an indigenous Australian people of the state of New South Wales.

Country

Alternative names
 Ettrick tribe
 Noowidal
 Nowgyjul
 Waibra
 Watchee
 Watji

Source:

Some words
 groomon or kroomon (kangaroo)
 kooning (mother)
 marmong (father)
 tobury (tame dog)
 tucki (whiteman)

Source:

Notes

Citations

Sources

Aboriginal peoples of New South Wales